During World War II, the Tangier International Zone was invaded and occupied by Francoist Spain. On 14 June 1940, days after the Italian declaration of war after the German invasion of France, Spain seized the opportunity and, amid the collapse of the French Third Republic, a contingent of 4,000 Moorish soldiers based in the Spanish Morocco occupied the Tangier International Zone, meeting no resistance. Despite the claim that the occupation was a "provisional" measure, the operation was the realization of a long-standing wish and prelude to a potential occupation of French Morocco that did not happen because Rabat ultimately rallied to the new Vichy regime. The Mendoub, the sultan's representative, was expelled in March 1941, further undermining French influence in Tangier's affairs.

Following the August 1945 Paris Conference on Tangier between the United Kingdom, France, the United States and the Soviet Union, an isolated Spain accepted the conditions lined up in the former on 19 September 1945 and retired from Tangier on 11 October 1945. Tangier then returned to the pre-war status of an international zone.

See also 
Spain during World War II
Meeting at Hendaye (23 October 1940)
Evacuation of the Gibraltarian civilian population during World War II (June 1940)

References 
Notes

Citations

Bibliography

Further reading

Spain in World War II
History of Tangier
World War II occupied territories